Rodney Court, also known as Rodney Court Co-operative, is a historic apartment building located at Wilmington, New Castle County, Delaware.

Career 
Rodney Court was built in 1928, and is a six-story, "L"-shaped steel frame apartment building. The frame is sheathed in cinder block and faced with light-colored tapestry bricks. It features cast-stone trimmings with classical motifs and an elaborate cast-stone classically styled parapet. 

It once had a large social hall adjoining a roof-top dance floor and roof garden, that has since been converted to a penthouse apartment. It is the last extant luxury apartment built in Wilmington before the Great Depression of the 1930s.

It was added to the National Register of Historic Places in 1980.

References

Residential buildings on the National Register of Historic Places in Delaware
Residential buildings completed in 1928
Buildings and structures in Wilmington, Delaware
National Register of Historic Places in Wilmington, Delaware